Buddhadev Mangaldas (born 20 June 1988) is an Indian first-class cricketer who plays for Goa.

References

External links
 

1988 births
Living people
Indian cricketers
Goa cricketers
Cricketers from Bangalore